Jayanth C. Paranji (born 21 July 1957) is an Indian film director known for his works predominantly in Telugu cinema. He introduced Bollywood actresses: Preity Zinta, Aishwarya Rai, Anjala Zaveri, Bipasha Basu, Lisa Ray, Nauheed Cyrusi to the Telugu screen. He has directed films across multiple genres with the fab four of Telugu Film Industry - Chiranjeevi, Balakrishna, Nagarjuna, Venkatesh. He has worked with all the top actors in the Telugu film industry including Pawan Kalyan and Mahesh Babu. Actor Prabhas was launched into films by Jayanth in the film Eeswar (2002).

Early career
Paranji was born in Karnataka to a Tamil speaking family. He grew up in Gandhinagar, Bangalore, which is where most of the Kannada film distributors have their offices. He began directing well-known plays in English after he settled in Hyderabad. He started the English theater troupe Muses and was associated with another English theater group, Dramatic Circle Hyderabad. Then he switched over to directing Telugu serials for the television. He shot to fame when his serial Tenalirama began to be telecast by Doordarshan. Shot in expensive sets, this serial quickly climbed to the number one spot. Paranji also contributed documentaries and advertising films before getting into feature films. His directorial debut was Preminchukundam Raa with Venkatesh playing the lead role.

Filmography

References

External links

Living people
20th-century Indian film directors
Telugu film directors
Kannada film directors
Indian male screenwriters
21st-century Indian film directors
Film directors from Karnataka
1961 births